Parenthood is an American comedic, television drama developed by Jason Katims and based upon the 1989 film of the same name produced by Brian Grazer and directed by Ron Howard, both of whom serve as executive producers along with Katims, David Nevins and Lawrence Trilling. The series premiered on March 2, 2010 on NBC. On May 11, 2014, NBC renewed Parenthood for a sixth and final season, which would consist of 13 episodes. On June 2, 2014, it was announced that the final season would premiere September 25, 2014. The series finale aired on January 29, 2015.

Series overview

Episodes

Season 1 (2010)

Season 2 (2010–11)

Season 3 (2011–12)

Season 4 (2012–13)

Season 5 (2013–14)

Season 6 (2014–15)

References

External links 
 
 

Lists of American comedy-drama television series episodes
Parenthood (2010 TV series) episodes